Michael F. Nozzolio (born April 10, 1951) is the former New York State Senator for the 54th district. He is a Republican. He was first elected in 1992. The 54th district included parts of the city of Auburn, New York, Geneva, New York, and part or all of the following counties, Wayne County, Ontario County, Cayuga County, Tompkins County, Seneca County, and Monroe County. Nozzolio did not seek re-election in 2016, and was succeeded by Pam Helming.

He previously served as a member of the state Assembly from 1983-92.

Biography
Nozzolio was born on April 10, 1951, in Seneca Falls, New York, the son of Anna and Albert F. Nozzolio. He and his wife, Rosemary, live in Fayette, in Seneca County, New York. He studied Industrial and Labor Relations as an undergraduate at Cornell University where he also earned a master's degree in Public Administration and Agricultural Economics. He holds a Juris Doctor from Syracuse University College of Law. Nozzolio also served as a JAG officer in the U.S. Naval Reserves and is currently a Commander in the New York Naval Militia.

Nozzolio has also been awarded the Father Joseph P. Beatini Memorial Award and was the recipient of the prestigious Jerome Alpern Distinguished Alumni Award from the Cornell School of Industrial and Labor Relations, one of the highest honors that can be bestowed on a Cornell University alumnus. Nozzolio currently serves as a member of the Cornell University Council and on the Board of the Cornell Agriculture and Food Technology Park. Nozzolio is also a member of the First Niagara Bank Advisory Board.

In 2011, Nozzolio voted against allowing same-sex marriage in New York during a senate roll-call vote on the Marriage Equality Act, which narrowly passed in a close 33-29 vote allowing same-sex marriage in New York.

In 2016, Nozzolio announced that he would not seek reelection, citing the prohibitive recovery period for an upcoming open-heart surgery. He is currently a Member of Harris Beach. law firm in Rochester, NY

References

1951 births
21st-century American politicians
Living people
Republican Party New York (state) state senators
Republican Party members of the New York State Assembly
Cornell University School of Industrial and Labor Relations alumni
Syracuse University College of Law alumni
People from Fayette, New York